Henriette Petit (pseudonym of Ana Enriqueta Petit Marfan; March 3, 1894 - December 9, 1983), was a Chilean painter, member of the Grupo Montparnasse, of which she was a co-founder.

Biography
Ana Enriqueta Petit Marfan was born in Santiago, March 3, 1894.

She began her career in the early 1910s, when she became a disciple of Juan Francisco González -considered one of the four "great masters of Chilean painting"- whom she met through her friend, the also painter, Marta Villanueva. Petit entered the School of Fine Arts in 1914, and two years later, she painted her first painting.

She traveled to Europe with her family between 1920 and 1921, a period in which she had classes in Paris, France, with the sculptor Antoine Bourdelle, who would portray her in a bust entitled Le Chilienne and whose works are in the artist's museum.  

In 1923, back in Chile, Petit joined the Montparnasse group, an avant-garde movement of influences from Post-Impressionism and Fauvism. The group included José Perotti and the brothers Julio and Manuel Ortiz de Zárate, as well as Luis Vargas Rosas. Petit and Vargas Rosa married in 1927, with the poet Vicente Huidobro as best man. 

In 1926, Petit settled in Paris, where she continued to specialize in sketches, drawing and painting, and joined the artistic environment which she shared with, among others, the French Le Corbusier and Fernand Léger, the Spanish Juan Gris, Joan Miró and Pablo Picasso, the British William Hayter and the American Alexander Calder. In the French capital, in addition to dedicating herself to painting, she worked at the Henri-Rousselle psychiatric hospital.

Petit and Vargas Rosas returned to Chile in 1941, due to World War II. Petit's artistic production declined notably due to the uprooting caused by being away from France. Her last trip to the Gallic country was in 1963. 

Petit died in Santiago, December 9, 1983.

Works 
 Dos desnudos
 Isla de Maipo
 Resignación

References

Bibliography 
 Quiroga, Samuel. "El rol de Henriette Petit en las artes visuales a comienzos del siglo XX". En: Torres, Tarik (Coordinador). Estudios del abordaje multidisciplinario del arte. México: Ediciones Eón, 2017, pp. 71 – 83. (in Spanish)

External links
 Henriette Petit at pintoreslatinoamericanos

1894 births
1983 deaths
Artists from Santiago
20th-century Chilean painters
20th-century Chilean women artists
Chilean women painters